The 1934 Putney by-election was held on 28 November 1934.  The by-election was held due to the death of the incumbent Conservative MP, Samuel Samuel.  It was won by the Conservative candidate Marcus Samuel.

References

Putney by-election
Putney by-election
Putney by-election
Putney,1934
Putney,1934
Putney